Earthfall may refer to:

 Earthfall (novel), a science fiction novel by American writer Orson Scott Card
 Earthfall (video game), a 4-player cooperative first-person shooter video game
 Earthfall (film) , a 2015 Amazon Prime Video Sci-Fi movie

See also
 Earth4All
 Skyfall (disambiguation)